Grant Horscroft (born 30 July 1961) is an English former professional footballer who played as a central defender in the Football League for Brighton & Hove Albion.

Horscroft was born in Fletching, East Sussex, in 1961. He played non-league football for Ringmer, Lewes and Sutton United, before joining Brighton & Hove Albion for a fee of £2,500, which remained, the Lewes club's record transfer fee received. He made two league appearances as Albion gained promotion as 1987–88 Third Division runners-up, before returning to non-league with Lewes, where he spent time as assistant manager and caretaker manager as well as player, and Ringmer.

References

1961 births
Living people
People from Wealden District
English footballers
Association football central defenders
Ringmer F.C. players
Lewes F.C. players
Sutton United F.C. players
Brighton & Hove Albion F.C. players
Isthmian League players
English Football League players